Sana'a Mehaidli (August 14, 1968 – April 9, 1985) was a member of the Syrian Social Nationalist Party who, at the age of 16 blew herself and a Peugeot filled with explosives up next to an Israeli convoy in Jezzine, Lebanon, during the Israeli occupation of South Lebanon. Twelve Israeli soldiers were killed and ten were injured.

Biography 
Mehaidli was born in 1968 in the village of Anqoun, near Sidon, in Lebanon, in a Christian family. She has four brothers and one sister. She worked at a video store, where she later recorded her will. In early 1985, she joined the Syrian Social Nationalist Party that was affiliated with the Lebanese National Resistance Front.

She is believed to have been the first female suicide bomber. She is known as "the Bride of the South".

References

External links
 SSNP video in Arabic about Sana'a Mehaidli. 

Female suicide bombers
Lebanese criminals
Female criminals
Lebanese Christians
Suicides in Lebanon
1968 births
1985 deaths
Syrian Social Nationalist Party
South Lebanon conflict (1985–2000)
Deaths by car bomb in Lebanon